Bremgarten District is a Swiss district in the  Canton of Aargau, corresponding to the valleys of the Reuss and Bünz rivers in the area known as the Freiamt.

Geography
Of this area, 48.7% is used for agricultural purposes, while 30.9% is forested. The rest of the land, (18.1%) is settled.

Demographics

, there were 2,402 homes with 1 or 2 persons in the household, 11,781 homes with 3 or 4 persons in the household, and 9,773 homes with 5 or more persons in the household.  The average number of people per household was 2.43 individuals.   there were 10,969 single family homes (or 37.2% of the total) out of a total of 29,488 homes and apartments.  There were a total of 479 empty apartments for a 1.6% vacancy rate.

Of the school age population, there are 5,276 students attending primary school, there are 1,992 students attending secondary school, there are 1,349 students attending tertiary or university level schooling, and there are 30 students who are seeking a job after school in the municipality.

Economy
 there were 33,414 residents who worked in the district, while 25,027 residents worked outside the Bremgarten district and 11,621 people commuted into the district for work.

Religion
Of the rest of the population, there were 70 individuals (or about 0.11% of the population) who belonged to the Christian Catholic faith.

Municipalities
  
<div style="padding:1em 20px 1em 20px; color:#000000;text-align:left;">

Mergers
The following changes to the district's municipalities have occurred since 2000:

 Hilfikon became part of Villmergen in 2010 (the area figure above includes Hilfikon).
 On 1 January 2014 the former municipality of Hermetschwil-Staffeln merged into the municipality of Bremgarten (AG).

References

Districts of Aargau